The Pubugou Dam is a concrete face rock-fill embankment dam on the Dadu River, a tributary of the Yangtze River in Sichuan Province. The main purpose of the dam is hydroelectric power generation and its total generating capacity is 3,300 MW.

Construction started on March 30, 2004, the first generator was put into operation in December 2009 and the rest by March 2010. In 2004, the construction site was overrun by tens of thousands of protesters, though the only eventual result was the delay of construction by one year. The protests were about evictions stemming from planned flooding.

See also 

 List of power stations in China

References 

Hydroelectric power stations in Sichuan
Dams in China
Concrete-face rock-fill dams
Dams completed in 2010
Dams on the Dadu River